Mathias Tulyoongeleni Hamunyela (born 15 October 1992) is a Namibian professional boxer. As an amateur he competed in the men's light flyweight event at the 2016 Summer Olympics where he defeated Rufat Huseynov in the first round but lost to Birzhan Zhakypov in the second round.

Professional boxing record

References

External links
 

1992 births
Living people
Namibian male boxers
Olympic boxers of Namibia
Boxers at the 2016 Summer Olympics
African Games silver medalists for Namibia
African Games medalists in boxing
Boxers at the 2018 Commonwealth Games
Commonwealth Games competitors for Namibia
Competitors at the 2015 African Games
Light-flyweight boxers
People from Ohangwena Region
20th-century Namibian people
21st-century Namibian people